Michael Degiorgio (born 15 November 1962) is a Maltese former professional footballer.

Degiorgio played as a midfielder until the end of his career, when he switched to a central defender.

Degiorgio started his career with Hamrun Spartans and then also played for Naxxar Lions, Lija Athletic and Marsaxlokk. Degiorgio is now managing Fgura.

Early life
Degiorgio was born on 15 November 1962 in Pietà. A product of amateur club Ħamrun Liberty, he started his playing career in the MAFA League.

Ħamrun Spartans 
Degiorgio was soon promoted to the Ħamrun Spartans . On 13 October 1979 he substituted Tonio Pace in a league game against Żebbuġ Rangers F.C.

On 10 November 1979 Degiorgio played his first full league game in a 0–0 draw against Floriana. Between 1982 and 1993, the Spartans, with Degiorgia won four championships, six FA Trophy winners' medals, and 20 major trophies.

Degiorgio played for the Spartans against Ballymena United, of Ireland. Ħamrun won both legs 1-0 and 2–1 to reach the second round of the Cup Winners' Cup. In the Champions Cup against Dundee United, he played in all 18 matches in Europe, 10 in the Champions Cup and eight in the Cup Winners' Cup.

In 1989–90, he was named MFA player of the year.

National team 
On 4 April 1981 Degiorgio earn his first international cap in a national team game against East Germany . Malta lost 1-2 but Degiorgio's performance earned him a regular place in the National XI.

By his own admission, Degiorgio's best international match was in 1985 against Portugal.  The national team lost 3–2, but  Degiorgio scored one goals.

Later career 
In 1993 Ħamrun transferred Degiorgio to the  Naxxar Lions.  He then help his new club gain promotion to the Premier Division in Malta. In 1996–97, he returned briefly to Ħamrun but the next year went back to Naxxar for two seasons.

In 1999 to 2000, Degiorgio joined Lija Athletic in the First Division and the next season he went to Marsaxlokk. In 2001–02, Degiorgio returned to Ħamrun. However, a successful protest against his eligibility forced him to stop after playing only one game in the Premier League. The next season he played six matches as a substitute before deciding to retire.

Legacy 
Degiorgio was also the first player to be included in the newly established professional scheme for national team players. It was a singular honour for the young midfielder, which continued to enhance his reputation as one of the best Maltese footballers of the modern era.

In a career spanning 23 years, Degiorgio rarely missed a game. Injuries hardly affected him. It was only towards the end of his career that he started to miss matches.

By the end of his career, Degiorgio had played 77 times for Malta.

Career statistics

International goals

References

External links
 Michael Degiorgio at MaltaFootball.com
 

Living people
1962 births
Maltese footballers
Malta international footballers
Ħamrun Spartans F.C. players
Lija Athletic F.C. players
Marsaxlokk F.C. players
Maltese football managers
Marsaxlokk F.C. managers
Association football defenders
Association football midfielders